Jarai (or ;) is a Malayo-Polynesian language spoken by the Jarai people of Vietnam and Cambodia. They are the largest of the upland ethnic groups of Vietnam's Central Highlands known as Degar or Montagnards, and 25 per cent of the population in the Cambodian province of Ratanakiri.

The language is in the Chamic subgroup of the Malayo-Polynesian languages, and is thus related to the Cham language of central Vietnam.

A number of Jarai also live in the United States, having resettled there following the Vietnam War.

Classification 
The Jarai language belongs to Chamic branch of the Malayo-Polynesian languages. Although often classified as a Mon-Khmer language until the 20th century, the affiliation of Jarai to the Chamic sister languages Cham and Rade, and a wider connection to Malay was already recognized as early as 1864.

Geographic distribution and dialects 

Jarai is spoken by some 262,800 people in Cambodia and Vietnam (Simons, 2017) where it is recognized as an official minority language, although in Cambodia it has not its own writing in the Khmer scripts. Additionally there are some hundreds of Jarai speakers in United States from the Jarai refugees settled in that country after the Vietnamese War. Jarai dialects can be mutually unintelligible. Đào Huy Quyền (1998) lists the following subgroups of Jarai dialects and their respective locations.

Jarai Pleiku: in the Pleiku area.
Jarai Cheoreo: in AJunPa (Phú Bổn).
Jarai ARáp: in northwestern Pleiku, southwestern Kon Tum.
Jarai H’dRung: in northeastern Pleiku, southeastern Kon Tum.
Jarai Tbuan: western Pleiku.

Other related groups include:

HRoi: in western Phú Yên, southern Bình Định. Mixed Ede and Jarai people.
M’dhur: in southern Phú Yên. Mixed Ede and Jarai people.
Hàlang: in southwestern Kon Tum, and some in Laos and Cambodia. Mixed Sedang and Jarai people.

Phonology 

Influenced by the surrounding Mon–Khmer languages, words of the various Chamic languages of Southeast Asia, including Jarai, have become disyllabic with the stress on the second syllable. Additionally, Jarai has further evolved in the pattern of Mon–Khmer, losing almost all vowel distinction in the initial minor syllable. While trisyllabic words do exist, they are all loanwords.  The typical Jarai word may be represented:

(C)(V)-C(C)V(V)(C)

where the values in parentheses are optional and "(C)" in the cluster "C(C)" represents a liquid consonant ,  or a semivowel , . In Jarai dialects spoken in Cambodia, the "(C)" in the cluster "C(C)" can also be the voiced velar fricative , a phoneme used by the Jarai in Cambodia, but not attested in Vietnam. The vowel of the first syllable in disyllabic words is most often the mid-central unrounded vowel, unless the initial consonant is the glottal stop .  The second vowel of the stressed syllable produces a diphthong.

Alphabet 

During the French Indochina, they introduced a Jarai alphabet using the Vietnamese alphabet at the beginning of the 20th century. With the introduction of the Bible in Jarai language, using that alphabet by Christian missionaries in Vietnam after the Vietnamese War, the Jarai increased their literacy and there are today many publications for the Vietnamese Jarai. There are 40 letters - 21 consonants + 19 vowels / 34 phonemes - 9 vowel phonemes + 25 consonant phonemes.

Vowels 
There are 9 vowels:

Consonants 

There are 24 consonants:

The implosives have also been described as preglottalized stops, but Jensen (2013) describes that the closure of glottis and oral cavity occur simultaneously.

References

Further reading 
 Jensen, Joshua M. (2013). The Structure of Jarai Clauses and Noun Phrases. PhD dissertation, University of Texas at Arlington. 
 Lafont, Pierre-Bernard & Nguyễn Văn Trọng (1968). Lexique jarai, français, viêtnamien, parler de la province de Plei Ku. Publications de l'Ecole française d'Extrême-Orient, v 63. Paris: École française d'Extrême-Orient.
 Pittman, R. S. (1957). Jarai as a member of the Malayo-Polynesian family of languages. Fargo, N.D.: Summer Institute of Linguistics, University of North Dakota.
 Reed, R. (1976). Jorai primer, guide and writing book. Vietnam education microfiche series, no. VE55-01/08/04. Huntington Beach, Calif: Summer Institute of Linguistics.
 Rơmah Dêl (1977). Từ Điển Việt - Gia Rai [Vietnamese - Jarai dictionary]. Hà Nội: Nhà xuất bản khoa học xã hội.
 Tong Nang, N. (1975). An outline of Jarai grammar. Vietnam data microfiche series, no. VD55-01. Huntington Beach, Calif: Summer Institute of Linguistics.
 Siu, Lap M. (2009). Developing the First Preliminary Dictionary of North American Jarai. Master of Arts thesis in Anthropology, Texas Tech University.

External links 

 A Preliminary Jarai - English Online Dictionary
 Preliminary research on Jarai phonology in Cambodia
 Fairly comprehensive bibliography of Jarai language research

Chamic languages
Languages of Vietnam
Languages of Cambodia